Coleophora kamiesella is a species of moth in the family Coleophoridae. It is found in Namibia and South Africa, where it has been recorded from the Northern Cape.

References 

 

kamiesella
Moths described in 2015
Moths of Africa